Trevor Sydney Bickle (born 17 July 1943 in Fremantle, Western Australia) is a former Western Australian athlete and Commonwealth pole vault champion.

At 16, Bickle was "volunteered" to contest an F-grade pole vault event at his local athletics club by his coach.  He won the event and went on to a highly successful international career in the sport.

In Jamaica four years later at 1966 Games he won again, retaining the Commonwealth title with a vault of  - his best competition result. He won Australian titles in 1963, 1966 and 1967 but was unlucky to miss selection for the 1964 Tokyo Olympics when he broke his pole in the selection trials.

Bickle retired from competition in 1967 when he represented the Commonwealth of Nations against the United States in Los Angeles.

In 1989 Bickle was inducted into the Western Australian Hall of Champions.

References

1943 births
Australian male pole vaulters
Athletes (track and field) at the 1962 British Empire and Commonwealth Games
Athletes (track and field) at the 1966 British Empire and Commonwealth Games
Commonwealth Games gold medallists for Australia
Commonwealth Games medallists in athletics
Track and field athletes from Western Australia
Western Australian Sports Star of the Year winners
South Fremantle Football Club players
Living people
20th-century Australian people
Sportspeople from Fremantle
Sportsmen from Western Australia
Medallists at the 1962 British Empire and Commonwealth Games
Medallists at the 1966 British Empire and Commonwealth Games